Passiflora kuranda is a plant in the passionfruit family Passifloraceae. It was first described in 2009.

Conservation
This species is listed by the Queensland Department of Environment and Science as least concern. , it has not been assessed by the IUCN.

Gallery

References

External links
 
 
 View a map of historical sightings of this species at the Australasian Virtual Herbarium
 View observations of this species on iNaturalist
 View images of this species on Flickriver

kuranda
Endemic flora of Queensland

Plants described in 2009